Leveille is a surname. Notable people with the name include:
 Charles Leveille (born 1983), an American speed skater
 Daultan Leveille (born 1990), a Canadian NCAA ice hockey player
 Kevin Leveille (born 1981), an American lacrosse player
 Lise Leveille (born 1982), a French Canadian gymnast
 Mike Leveille (born 1985), a professional lacrosse player
 Normand Leveille (born 1963), a retired Canadian professional hockey player

See also
 Léveillé